Dioscoreophyllum is a genus of three species of flowering plants in the family Menispermaceae, native to Africa. The species are lianas.

Species
Dioscoreophyllum cumminsii (Stapf) Diels
Dioscoreophyllum gossweileri Exell
Dioscoreophyllum volkensii Engl.

References

Menispermaceae
Menispermaceae genera
Flora of Africa